The Pont Amont (French for "upriver bridge") is a bridge in Paris  which carries the Boulevard Périphérique (Paris' inner ring road) over the Seine River. Entirely dedicated to motor traffic, it is the first bridge to be seen when following the Seine downstream into Paris. The bridge links the 12th and 13th arrondissements, near the Quai d'Ivry and the Quai de Bercy.

The bridge being 270 m long, it is the second longest bridge in Paris, after its downstream counterpart, the Pont Aval, which also carries the Périphérique. Inaugurated in 1969, it has not been given an official name : its current designation (Pont Amont) is, much like for the Pont Aval, completely unofficial.

See also

List of crossings of the River Seine

External links

  Bridges of Paris
  Structurae
  Project "Bridges of Paris"

Amont
Amont
Buildings and structures in the 12th arrondissement of Paris
Buildings and structures in the 13th arrondissement of Paris